The Army Council was the supreme administering body of the British Army from its creation in 1904 until it was reconstituted as the Army Board in 1964.

History
The disastrous campaigns of the Crimean War led to the consolidation of all administrative duties in 1855 under the Secretary of State for War, a Cabinet post.  That office was not, however, solely responsible for the Army; the Commander-in-Chief (C-in-C) held a virtually equal level of responsibility. This was reduced in theory by the 1870 reforms introduced by Edward Cardwell, which subordinated the C-in-C to the Secretary for War. In practice, however, a huge amount of influence was retained by the exceedingly conservative C-in-C Field Marshal Prince George, 2nd Duke of Cambridge, who held the post between 1856–1895. His resistance to reform caused military efficiency to lag well behind Britain's rivals, a problem which became painfully obvious during the Second Boer War.

The situation was only remedied in 1904 when the post of Commander-in-Chief was abolished and replaced with that of the Chief of the General Staff. An Army Council was created along similar lines to the Board of Admiralty, chaired by the Secretary of State for War, and an Imperial General Staff was established to coordinate Army administration.  All branches of the Army were directed to be subordinated to the Army Council, which was designated as the "supreme administering body" of the Army.

In 1964 the Army Council was reconstituted as the Army Board.

Principal members of the council
Political
 Secretary of State for War, as President of the Army Council
 Parliamentary Under-Secretary of State for War
 Financial Secretary to the War Office (1904-1947)

Military
 Chief of the (Imperial) General Staff
 Adjutant-General to the Forces
 Quartermaster-General to the Forces
 Master-General of the Ordnance (1904-1939, 1960-1964)
 Deputy Chief of the General Staff, (1914–1922, 1938–1940, 1942-1964)
 Vice-Chief of the Imperial General Staff, (1940–1964)

The Permanent Under-Secretary of State for War served as Secretary of the Army Council. A number of other office holders were members of the Army Council for brief periods including the Director General of the Territorial Army and the Director General of Munitions Production.

See also
Esher Report

Notes

References

 

1904 in military history
Ministry of Defence (United Kingdom)
20th-century history of the British Army
1904 establishments in the United Kingdom
1964 disestablishments in the United Kingdom